Robert P. Lattimer (February 2, 1945 - ) is a retired chemist who worked for Lubrizol as an Advanced Materials research and development technical fellow. He is an advocate for including the pseudoscience of intelligent design in public science curriculum.

Education 

Lattimer attended the University of Missouri where he earned a B.S. in chemistry.  He obtained his doctoral degree in 1971 in physical/analytical chemistry from the University of Kansas.

Career 

Lattimer worked for Noveon and Lubrizol as a research chemist.  He retired as a Senior Technical Fellow following nearly 40 years of service.  His published work on mass spectrometry and polymer characterization and degradation have been widely cited.  He is a past Vice-President of the American Society for Mass Spectrometry. Lattimer was Vice-Chairman of the 1985 Gordon Research Conference on Analytical Pyrolysis.

Political Advocacy 

Lattimer is a board member for the Eagle Forum of Ohio. He has advocated for pro-family issues in the state, and he has been the Science Issues Chairman. He advocated for including Intelligent Design in the Ohio Board of Education's state science curriculum.  Lattimer was a founder of the advocacy group Science Excellence for All Ohioans (SEAO).  He co-authored a book titled The Evolution Controversy.

Awards and recognition

 1990 - Sparks–Thomas award
 2008 - Melvin Mooney Distinguished Technology Award from the ACS Rubber Division

He is a recipient of an Eagle Award from Eagle Forum and a Wedge of Truth Award from IDnet.

References 

1945 births
Polymer scientists and engineers
20th-century American engineers
Living people
Intelligent design advocates
University of Missouri alumni
University of Kansas alumni
Mass spectrometrists